5100 may refer to:

Time
 A.D. 5100, a year in the 6th millennium CE
 5100 BC, a year in the 6th millennium BCE

Products
 Atari 5100, a home videogame console
 GWR 5100 Class, a class of side tank steam locomotive
 IBM 5100 (IBM Portable Computer), one of the first portable computers
 Jabiru 5100, an aircraft engine
 JGR Class 5100, a class of steam locomotive
 Nokia 5100, a GSM cellphone

Other uses
 5100 Pasachoff, an asteroid in the Asteroid Belt, the 5100th asteroid registered
 5100, a number in the 5000 (number) range

See also